Snugburys is an English ice cream manufacturer based at Park Farm in Hurleston, near Nantwich, in the county of Cheshire. Snugburys makes over 35 flavours of ice cream. In addition to ice cream production, Snugburys also regularly produces large sculptures made of steel-reinforced straw.

Location 
Snugburys operates out of a Cheshire farm (with associated farm shop) called Park Farm or Snugbury's Ice Cream Farm. It is located on Chester Road in Hurleston near Nantwich in the United Kingdom, near to the Llangollen Canal. In February 2019 Snugburys opened their second location in Chester, called Snugburys on the River.

History 

The business was founded in 1986. It was converted from a dairy farm to an ice cream factory by Chris and Cheryl Sadler. It opened a new ice cream shop in the barn on the site in 2011, and has three ice cream vans. They opened an ice cream parlour in the Lakeside Cafe at Trentham Estate in 2016. Snugburys produces around 35 flavours of ice cream, which have included flavours like damson and sloe gin and toffee crumble.

The business was taken over by the Sadlers' daughters Hannah, Kitty, and Cleo when their parents retired in 2016; the sisters became directors of the company in November 2015.

In 2020, Snugburys launched their drive thru at their Nantwich site in response to the Covid pandemic.

Straw sculptures 
Snugburys has been making straw sculptures since 1998, when its first straw sculpture portrayed the Millennium Dome. The sculptures are reinforced with steel, and are constructed to attract visitors to the farm and to raise money for charity. In 2015 the Guinness Book of Records included mention of Snugbury's straw Dalek as the "Largest Dalek sculpture". The sculptures are created by Mike Harper of Harbrook Engineering.

List of sculptures

References 

Ice cream brands
Sculptures in England
2017 fires in the United Kingdom
Food and drink companies of England
Nantwich
Companies based in Cheshire
2017 in England